The 2022 Ronde van Drenthe was a Dutch road cycling one-day race that took place on 12 March 2022. It was the 15th edition of Ronde van Drenthe and the 2nd event of the 2022 UCI Women's World Tour. It was won by Lorena Wiebes in a sprint finish.

Teams
Eleven UCI Women's WorldTeams, seven UCI Women's Continental Teams, and the national Dutch team make up the twenty teams that will compete in the race. Three Women's WorldTeams, EF Education–Tibco–SVB, Roland Cogeas Edelweiss Squad and Team Movistar skipped this race. 

UCI Women's WorldTeams

 
 
 
 
 
 
 
 
 
 
 

UCI Women's Continental Teams

 
 
 
 
 
 
 

National Teams

 Netherlands

Route
The  route from Assen to Hoogeveen uses generally flat roads in the Drenthe region of the Netherlands, with the challenge being four ascents of the VAMberg - a hill built on a landfill site. The climb is 750m in length with an average gradient of 4.2% and a maximum gradient of 20%. Other difficulties are the ten cobbled sections on the route.

Summary
The multiple ascents of the VAMberg climb led to a race full of attacks and breakaways. The distance from the last ascent of the climb to the finish in Hoogeveen was 14km, with a four woman group caught within the final kilometre. Lorena Wiebes of Team DSM outsprinted world champion Elisa Balsamo to win in a bunch sprint, despite a suffering puncture in the closing stages of the race.

Result

Source

References 

2022 UCI Women's World Tour
2022
2022 in Dutch women's sport
March 2022 sports events in the Netherlands